Indio Rico is a small town in southern Buenos Aires Province, Argentina, located in the district of Coronel Pringles.

Location 
It is reached by Provincial Route 85 from which it is  along a fully surfaced road.

Toponymy 
The name comes from the creek that passes within  of the town, its Indian name would be "Quetru Queyu" or "Guetzu-güeyu", words meaning "place of the caldenes". While researchers believe the term "rich Indian", is related to ulmen in the Mapuche language: powerful cacique, or rich chief.

History 
The site now occupied by the city had a history of native Indian attacks. One of them took place on June 14, 1870. The Indians entered by the source of the  Quequén Salado (the river from which originates the Indio Rico creek) surprising the military forces. Many occupants were killed and their homes burned down. The development of a general industrial factory by John P. Alchurrut at the end of the 19th century was one of the first attempts populate the site. On December 7, 1929 the LDS Railways opened Indio Rico station for cargo, passengers and livestock. On 19 February the following year the provincial Parliament approved the creation of a center of population, based on land donated by Maria Bernasconi, and with the auction of 300 parcels of land and 58 detached houses families could settle and protect themselves. Later this was complemented by a second auction of 418 plots and 108 houses.

Economy 
Its main activity is agriculture and livestock. Near the town is the "Indio Rico" pressure plant on two major gas pipelines belonging to TGS and the "Indio Rico" Pumping Station on a major oil pipeline of REPSOL-YPF.

Population 
INDEC had 1165 inhabitants at 2001, which represents an increase of 15.6% compared to the 1008 from the previous census in 1991.

Education 
The town has preschool, primary and secondary school levels.

Sports and social 
The Indio Rico Athletic and Social Club and the Eleven Hearts Club provide the sports and social needs.

They stand out for their provision of traditional events, such as "Bucking and Riders" organized by Eleven Hearts or "Traditional Carnival," with parades of floats, barbecues and art shows held yearly in Rincon Criollo.

Eleven Hearts Club has football as its principal sport, participating in the Tresarroyo Regional League in the first Division 1994 to date, Bochas, a form of bowls, is also practiced in their own alleys.

The Indio Rico Athletic and Social Club, has a unique sport, the Paddle.

Religion 

Media 
 Radio Fm Aboriginal 105.3 MHz
 Digital Aboriginal
 Agricultural Regional Magazine Campo Total (Total Field)
 Cablevision
 Daily newspapers available:
La Voz del Pueblo de Tresarroyos (The Voice of Tres Arroyos)
El Diario de Pringles (The Pringles Daily)
La Nueva Provincia of Bahia Blanca (The New Province de Bahia Blanca)

External links 
 Satellite Image of Indio Rico
 Website of the Municipality of Coronel Pringles
  History of Indio Rico (Spanish)

Populated places in Buenos Aires Province